The Pennsylvania State Game Lands Number 47 are Pennsylvania State Game Lands in Venango Counties in Pennsylvania in the United States providing hunting, bird watching, and other activities.

Geography
State Game Lands Number 47 is located in Cranberry and President Townships in Venango County.

Statistics

References

047
Protected areas of Venango County, Pennsylvania